Paul Benjamin Arthurs (born 23 June 1965), known professionally as Bonehead, is an English musician. He is best known as the rhythm guitarist, occasional keyboardist and co-founder of the rock band Oasis.

Early life
Paul Benjamin Arthurs was born at Saint Mary's Hospital in Manchester, the son of Irish Catholic immigrants. He went to St. Peter's Roman Catholic Grammar School in the nearby town of Prestwich. He earned the lifelong nickname of "Bonehead" at the age of eight after his parents insisted he get very short haircuts. "It was only my mum and dad throughout my life, really, that called me Paul," Arthurs said. Arthurs left school in 1981 and worked as a plasterer. He started his first band, Pleasure and Pain, in 1984. Around this time, he began a relationship with his future wife Kate. In the late 1980s, while working as a building contractor, he started a band, the Rain, with his friends Paul "Guigsy" McGuigan, Tony McCarroll, and Chris Hutton. Unlike the Gallagher Brothers who are Manchester City F.C supporters, Bonehead is a Manchester United supporter.

Career

Oasis 
When Hutton was sacked, he was replaced by Liam Gallagher, who suggested the band change their name to Oasis. Gallagher and Arthurs teamed up as co-songwriters. However, the band were still unsuccessful until Gallagher encouraged his brother Noel, who had just come back from travelling the world as a roadie for Inspiral Carpets, to join the band. Noel brought with him a collection of songs that were to make the band famous. Arthurs remembers the first songs Noel Gallagher played to him, "Live Forever" and "All Around the World". Arthurs broke down and cried when Noel played "Champagne Supernova" to the band on their tour bus. On the Definitely Maybe DVD, he said his favourite Oasis song to play live was "Columbia", as the song only consisted of three chords that create a hypnotic groove. 

When Oasis performed the song "Whatever" on Top of the Pops, they mimed and one of the cellists from the string section was replaced by Arthurs. Towards the end of the song, he started using the bow to conduct.

Arthurs is a multi-instrumentalist, credited as having played piano and mellotron on (What's the Story) Morning Glory? and can be seen on piano in the video for "Don't Look Back in Anger", as well as pictures featured in the Definitely Maybe album booklet. Arthurs briefly shifted to bass guitar after Scott McLeod — who replaced McGuigan before he was convinced to rejoin — quit in the middle of Oasis' 1995 U.S. tour; he appeared with the band on the Late Show with David Letterman playing bass.

Arthurs was originally supposed to sing lead vocals on the (What's the Story) Morning Glory? vinyl bonus track Bonehead's Bank Holiday (named after him). After he and Liam Gallagher got drunk the day of recording the song, Noel Gallagher sang lead vocals instead. Backing vocals from both Arthurs and Liam can be heard on the track.

Post-Oasis
Arthurs left the band in 1999, during the recording of Oasis's fourth album, Standing on the Shoulder of Giants. His official statement said he wanted to spend more time with his family (his first child, Lucy was born 23 January 1995 and his son, Jude Arthurs was born on 12 August 1997).

Arthurs was replaced by Gem Archer, who was thereafter pointedly referred to as a "professional". The rest of the band downplayed the reaction to his departure, Noel Gallagher commenting "it's hardly Paul McCartney leaving The Beatles" though he also said "We've got to respect their (Bonehead and Guigs's) decision as family men." Gallagher has admitted on several occasions to holding no malice toward the former rhythm guitarist and admiring him for the effort he put forth. In 2016, Gallagher said Arthurs was "the spirit of Oasis."

Arthurs now lives in Manchester where he has built a recording studio under his house and formed Moondog One (named after Johnny and the Moondogs, one of the Beatles' former titles before they rose to fame), which also includes The Smiths' Mike Joyce and Andy Rourke.

In 2004, Arthurs teamed up with Sek Loso to play rhythm guitar alongside Loso's new English bandmates. The group toured Asia, Europe, and the US in search of a label deal.

In early 2007, Arthurs had a visible presence in the North West of England for the first time since leaving Oasis eight years previously.  His support for Andy Rourke's Versus Cancer fundraising concert saw the pair busking together in Manchester's Cathedral Gardens to raise cancer awareness and to fund raise for Manchester's Christie Hospital.  On 30 March 2007, the Versus Cancer concert was held at Manchester's MEN Arena.  Arthurs played bass guitar (rather than the trademark rhythm guitar from his Oasis days) in a two-song set. He was in a band billed as 'Electric Milk Band', which also featured former members of Happy Mondays.

He has been playing DJ sets in clubs, most recently in London. His playlist features Oasis songs such as
"Live Forever", and collaborations between the Gallagher brothers and Death in Vegas and The Chemical Brothers.

He also presented a radio show on BBC Radio Manchester with Terry Christian, Natalie-eve and Michelle Hussey. The show is Manchester Music and has had fellow Manchester music artists as guests including members of Happy Mondays, The Smiths and The Charlatans.

In 2018, Arthurs was set to appear on the ITV show Dancing on Ice. However, he suffered an injury during training, after crashing into a rink-side vending machine.

Solo projects
Arthurs started this project in early 2013 with Vinny Peculiar (aka Alan Wilkes). Their 'group' Parlour Flames released an eponymous album in May 2013, Arthurs's first since leaving Oasis.
Guest musicians on the project included percussionist Che Beresford and brass-player Bob Marsh from Badly Drawn Boy and Anna Zweck from Samson & Delilah on flute and backing vocals.

Arthurs's latest project was started in 2014 with singer/songwriter Alex Lipinski. Their EP was released in May 2014 under Cherry Red Records. The EP includes four tracks and is available on vinyl and digital download.

Beady Eye
In 2013 and 2014, Gem Archer left the band Beady Eye twice due to a head injury. Gem was replaced by Arthurs and for the first time in 15 years Liam and Paul stood together on stage.

Liam Gallagher
Paul also joined Liam Gallagher to play rhythm guitar on the song "Bold" and keyboard on "For What It's Worth" on Liam's solo album As You Were. He joined the band on their debut performance at the O2 Ritz in Manchester, playing rhythm guitar on the Oasis track "Be Here Now". 

On 22 May 2018, Arthurs performed with Gallagher at the London Stadium as part of Gallagher's support slot for The Rolling Stones.

On 18 August 2018, Arthurs along with his son Jude and Richard Ashcroft, joined Gallagher on stage to perform "Live Forever" at Gallagher's gig at Old Trafford Cricket Ground.

During November 2019, Arthurs joined Gallagher on stage to perform Oasis songs during Gallagher's UK and Ireland 'Why Me, Why Not' shows, usually amounting to 10 or 11 songs in a set. As of 2020, Arthurs continues to tour with the Liam Gallagher band.

Arthurs also joined Liam Gallagher for a virtual reality concert on 5 December 2020 called “Down By The River Thames”.

From 27 to 29 August 2021, Arthurs joined Gallagher to perform his set headlining Reading & Leeds Festivals, playing songs from Gallagher's solo career, as well as songs originally recorded by Oasis.

On 26 April 2022, Arthurs announced a statement saying that he had been diagnosed with tonsil cancer and could not join Gallagher on his tour in order to do treatment. On September 29, 2022, Arthurs announced that he’s been declared cancer-free.  Six months later, Arthurs confirmed that he will play with Liam again on his 2023 tour.

Equipment
Arthurs used the same 1982 Japanese-made Matsumoku Epiphone Riviera throughout his time as Oasis' rhythm guitarist. He still uses this guitar today. He has also been known to play piano as heard in the songs “Don't Look Back In Anger” and “The Masterplan”, mellotron on "Wonderwall" along with playing electric piano at the 1994 MTV Most Wanted for the songs “Live Forever” and “Whatever”.

References

Other sources
Oasis: What's the Story?; Ian Robertson; Blake Publishing; 1996
Definitely Maybe; Big Brother DVDs; 2004

External links
The official Parlour Flames website

1965 births
Living people
English rock guitarists
Oasis (band) members
Musicians from Manchester
People from Burnage
Rhythm guitarists
Britpop musicians
English rock pianists
English rock keyboardists
English multi-instrumentalists